Applegarth may refer to:

People with the surname
Adam Applegarth (born 1962), the Chief Executive Officer of the Northern Rock bank
Mark Applegarth (born 1984), professional rugby league footballer
Peter Applegarth (born 1958), justice of the Supreme Court of Queensland
Rufus Applegarth (1844–1921), American lawyer and politician, member of the Maryland House of Delegates
Robert Applegarth (1834–1924), prominent British trade unionist
Willie Applegarth (1890–1958), British athlete, winner of gold medal in 4 × 100 m relay at the 1912 Summer Olympics

Places

In Scotland
Applegarth, Dumfries and Galloway

In England
Applegarth, North Yorkshire

In the United States
Applegarth, New Jersey